Kathleen Haddon Rishbeth (13 May 1888 – 6 September 1961) was a British zoologist, photographer and collector of string figures. She was the wife of Australian geographer Oswald Rishbeth.

Early life and education
Kathleen Haddon was born in Kingstown, County Dublin, Ireland, the daughter of anthropologist and zoologist A. C. Haddon. She was educated at the Perse School for Girls and Newnham College, Cambridge, where she began studying zoology in 1907. She and her sister Mary accompanied their parents to the United States in 1909, where the sisters helped collect string games from coastal communities in Alaska. As a woman, Haddon was ineligible to receive a degree from Cambridge University in 1911, (although she did eventually receive a degree in 1948) but was appointed to work as a University Demonstrator in Zoology from 1911 to 1914.

Career
In 1914, she travelled with her father as photographer for a three-month survey of the southern coast of Papua, taking covert photographs with a portable folding Vest Pocket Kodak camera, as well as more elaborately prepared photographs with a stand camera. She did not publish her typed manuscript account of the voyage.

She died in Cambridge in 1961.

Family
In September 1917 Kathleen Haddon married Oswald Rishbeth, an Australian geographer and classicist who served in the British military in World War I. They had three children, including the biologist John Rishbeth, and physicist Henry Rishbeth.

Works

Books
 Cat's Cradles from Many Lands. London: Longmans, Green & Co, 1901. .
 Artists in String, String Figures: Their Regional Distribution and Social Significance. London: Methuen & Co. Ltd, 1930. .
 String Games for Beginners. 1934. .

Articles
 'In Papua with a Piece of String', The Chronicle of the London Missionary Society, July 1915, p. 140.
 'Some Australian String Figures', Proceedings of the Royal Society of Victoria, N.S. Vol. 30, No. 2 (1918), pp. 121–36. Melbourne: Ford & Son.
 'In the Gulf of New Guinea', Country Life Vol. 24 (1929), pp. 268–70.

References

1888 births
1961 deaths
Alumni of Newnham College, Cambridge
20th-century British zoologists
English non-fiction writers
English women writers
Photographers from Cambridgeshire
String figures
English women photographers
Women zoologists
20th-century British women scientists
People from Dún Laoghaire